Phonon is a cloud telephony company in Asia. It was founded in October 2006 by Samish Makhija and Ujwal Makhija, who are alumni of IIM Ahmedabad and IIM Calcutta.

Customers
The service of Phonon Communications used by some notable agencies including BFSI, Travel, and Airlines. It was also used by airline group Kingfisher Airlines and Rediff. In January 2017, Indian domestic airline Vistara implemented Phonon's Unified Communication Solution for flight advisories.

Purposes
It provides Automated Outbound Diallers, and Click-to-Call for instant call back from websites. It acquires iDeliver, home to India's largest loanbot. It automates communications over voice & text using global AI & ML platforms for large enterprises world-wide.

Awards
Phonon was recognized as the "Best Contact Centre Automation Provider" for BFSI sector in the 3rd BFSI innovation summit 2019, organized by eLets Technomedia and Government of Maharashtra. In November 2016 Phonon was awarded the #400 spot on Deloitte's 2016 Technology Fast 500 Asia Pacific List as well as the #47 spot on Deloitte's 2015 Technology Fast 50 India List. In September 2016 Phonon was awarded with the Red Herring Top 100 Asia award.

References

External links
 

Companies based in Vadodara
2006 establishments in Gujarat
Indian companies established in 2006
Telecommunications companies established in 2006
Telecommunications companies of India